Padme (Sanskrit पद्म "Lotus flower") may refer to:

 Padmé Amidala, a fictional character in the Star Wars franchise
 Om mani padme hum, a mantra particularly associated with the four-armed Shadakshari form of Avalokiteśvara
 Phobos And Deimos & Mars Environment (PADME), a proposed Mars orbiter

See also
 Padma (disambiguation)
 Pad (disambiguation)